Justin Donnnell Shaffer (born June 20, 1998) is an American football guard for the Atlanta Falcons of the National Football League (NFL). He played college football at Georgia.

Early life and high school
Shaffer grew up in Ellenwood, Georgia and attended Cedar Grove High School. He was rated a three-star recruit and initially committed to play college football at Louisville during his junior year. Shaffer flipped his commitment to Georgia shortly before National Signing Day.

College career
Shaffer saw playing time as a reserve offensive lineman as a freshman and sophomore. He made his first career start as a junior against Tennessee and started the next game before suffering a season-ending neck injury. Shaffer started all of the Bulldogs' regular season games at left tackle and started in the 2021 Peach Bowl at left guard. Shaffer decided to utilize the extra year of eligibility granted to college athletes who played in the 2020 season due to the coronavirus pandemic and return to Georgia for a fifth season.

Professional career

Atlanta Falcons
Shaffer was drafted in the sixth round with the 190th pick by the Atlanta Falcons in the 2022 NFL Draft. He was waived on August 30 and re-signed to the practice squad. He signed a reserve/future contract on January 9, 2023.

Personal life
Shaffer is first cousins with DeAngelo Malone who also was drafted by the Falcons in the 2022 NFL Draft.

References

External links 
 Atlanta Falcons bio
Georgia Bulldogs bio

Living people
American football offensive guards
Georgia Bulldogs football players
Players of American football from Georgia (U.S. state)
Atlanta Falcons players
1998 births